The 2015 FIFA Women's World Cup qualification UEFA Group 1 was a UEFA qualifying group for the 2015 FIFA Women's World Cup. The group comprised Croatia, Germany, Republic of Ireland, Russia, Slovakia and Slovenia.

The group winners qualified directly for the 2015 FIFA Women's World Cup. Among the seven group runners-up, the four best (determined by records against the first-, third-, fourth- and fifth-placed teams only for balance between different groups) advanced to the play-offs.

Standings

Results
All times are CEST (UTC+02:00) during summer and CET (UTC+01:00) during winter.

Goalscorers
11 goals
 Anja Mittag

9 goals
 Célia Šašić

8 goals
 Dzsenifer Marozsán

7 goals
 Ekaterina Pantyukhina

5 goals
 Fatmire Alushi
 Nadine Keßler

4 goals
 Simone Laudehr
 Melanie Leupolz

3 goals

 Izabela Lojna
 Lena Goeßling
 Alexandra Popp
 Denise O'Sullivan
 Fiona O'Sullivan
 Ksenia Tsybutovich

2 goals

 Lena Lotzen
 Stephanie Roche
 Julie-Ann Russell
 Elena Morozova
 Kaja Jerina
 Andreja Nikl
 Mateja Zver

1 goal

 Leonarda Balog
 Helenna Hercigonja-Moulton
 Katarina Kolar
 Iva Landeka
 Saskia Bartusiak
 Melanie Behringer
 Annike Krahn
 Leonie Maier
 Bianca Schmidt
 Luisa Wensing
 Diane Caldwell
 Áine O'Gorman
 Louise Quinn
 Nelli Korovkina
 Valentina Orlova
 Alla Sidorovskaya
 Ekaterina Sochneva
 Elena Terekhova
 Anisa Rola
 Diana Bartovičová
 Alexandra Bíróová
 Eva Kolenová
 Lucia Ondrušová
 Dominika Škorvánková
 Lucia Šušková

2 own goals
 Helenna Hercigonja-Moulton (playing against Germany)

1 own goal
 Eva Kolenová (playing against Russia)
 Luzija Grad (playing against Russia)

References

External links
Women's World Cup – Qualifying round Group 1, UEFA.com

 

Group 1
2013–14 in German women's football
Qual
2013–14 in Russian football
2014–15 in Russian football
2013–14 in Croatian football
2014–15 in Croatian football
2013–14 in Slovenian football
2014–15 in Slovenian football
2013–14 in Slovak football
2014–15 in Slovak football
2013–14 in Republic of Ireland women's association football
2014–15 in Republic of Ireland women's association football